Walther Kiaulehn  (July 4, 1900 in Berlin – December 7, 1968 in Munich) was a German journalist and writer.

Biography 

After completing his studies as an electrician, Kiaulehn chose to work as journalist.  In 1924, he started writing for Berliner Abendblatt (Berlin Evening Newspaper), and then between 1930 and 1933 for B.Z. am Mittag (Berlin Noon Newspaper).  His pen name during this time was "Lehnau".

At the end of the 1930s, Kiaulehn worked as occasional speaker of the weekly UFA Wochenschau newsreel, as well as for various Nazi documentaries (Kulturfilme).

He spent the years 1939 and 1940 as a soldier.  From 1940 to 1942-43 he served as a reporter with special status for the foreign Nazi magazine Signal, published in France, Belgium, occupied territories of the Soviet Union and in the Balkans.  In 1943, Propaganda Minister Joseph Goebbels assigned him to work on scripts for indispensable propagandistic Kulturfilme.  The rest of the war he spent as military editor of the Signal in Berlin.  In 1944 he was primarily responsible with the magazine's articles related to Berlin's stand-up.

In 1945, after the end of World War II, Kiaulehn moved to Munich.  There, he worked as an actor in the "small comedy" and in public theatre, and as cabaret artist, in which quality he played in 1946 in a program of the legendary cabaret Schaubude.  He also played parts in various post-war movies.  In the 1950s he was head of the arts section at Münchner Merkur, where he worked as a redactor and theater critic until his death in 1968.

Works 

  lean from comfort booklet and laughter book  (feuilletons). Berlin: Ernst Rowohlt, 1932. (The book became 1933 of national socialists and seize.) 
  reader for Lächler . Berlin: Ernst Rowohlt publishing house, 1938. 
 Die eisernen Engel: Geburt, Geschichte und Macht der Maschinen von der Antike bis zur Goethezeit (The Iron Angels: birth, history and power of the machines from antiquity to the time of Goethe). Berlin: Deutscher Verlag, 1935.
  Berlin. The Story [Fate] of a Metropolitan City. 1958. 
  Rüdesheimer of fragments  (with designs of Heinrich count Luckner). Berlin: Ernst Staneck publishing house, 1961. 
  my friend of the publishers. Ernst Rowohlt and its time. Reinbek with Hamburg: Rowohlt publishing house, 1967. 
  praise of the quiet city  (feuilletons from the publications from 1932 to 1938, hrsg. of Detlef Bluhm). Berlin: Fannei & roll, 1989, . 
  Berlin - praise of the quiet city  (follows the expenditure of Fannei & roll from 1989; likewise hrsg. of Detlef Bluhm). Frankfurt/Main: Schöffling & CO., 1998.

Filmography 

 as actor:  
1947 - Between Yesterday and Tomorrow
1948 - 
1949 - Tragödie einer Leidenschaft
1949 - Du bist nicht allein
1949 - Heimliches Rendezvous
1950 - Trouble in Paradise
1950 - The Falling Star
1951 - Fanfares of Love
1955 - Ein Weihnachtslied in Prosa
1955 - Lola Montès (uncredited)

 as writer:  
1936 - Kopfjäger von Borneo
1938 - Aus der Heimat des Freischütz

References 
Gwendolyn von Ambesser: Schaubudenzauber - Geschichte und Geschichten eines legendären Kabaretts. Verlag Edition AV, Lich/Hessen 2006,

External links 
 

German male journalists
1900 births
1968 deaths
20th-century German novelists
German male novelists
20th-century German male writers
20th-century German journalists
German military personnel of World War II